Oh, My NOLA is an album from Harry Connick Jr. with his big band. The album was released in 2007, and contains well-known songs associated with New Orleans, as well as 4 new songs composed by Connick, who sings and plays the piano, conducts, arranges and orchestrates the album.

A portion of the royalties of Oh, My NOLA will be donated to Musicians' Village in New Orleans. He was honored with a "Strength and Spirit Award" from Redbook magazine in October 2006, for contributing proceeds from various music sales, and for his work on the Musicians' Village.

The album was released at the same day as his big band instrumental album Chanson du Vieux Carre.

The album debuted at #1 on the Billboard Top Jazz Albums, and at #11 on the Billboard 200, with 44,000 copies sold.

A concert tour, the My New Orleans Tour, started on February 23, 2007 in North America, went on to Europe, and continued to Asia and Australia in 2008.

Track listing
"Working In The Coal Mine" (Allen Toussaint) – 3:36
"Won't You Come Home, Bill Bailey?" (Hughie Cannon) – 3:56
"Something You Got" (Chris Kenner) – 3:24
"Let Them Talk" (Sonny Thompson) – 5:01
"Jambalaya (On the Bayou)" (Hank Williams) – 3:40
"Careless Love" (Martin Kaelin, Mac Rebennack) – 4:13
"All These People" (Harry Connick Jr.) – 4:12 – featuring Kim Burrell
"Yes We Can Can" (Allen Toussaint) – 4:32
"Someday" (Dave Bartholomew, Pearl King) – 2:38
"Oh, My NOLA" (Connick) – 3:58
"Elijah Rock" (traditional) – 4:43
"Sheik Of Araby" (Harry Smith, Francis Wheeler, Ted Snyder) – 4:57
"Lazy Bones" (Hoagy Carmichael, Johnny Mercer) – 3:47
"We Make A Lot Of Love" (Connick) – 3:31
"Hello Dolly" (Jerry Herman) – 4:25
"Do Dat Thing" (Connick) – 5:33

Bonus tracks
Borders: "Just Come Home"
Wal-Mart: "Take Her To The Mardi Gras" (Connick)
Japan release: "Just Come Home", "Take Her To The Mardi Gras"

Charts

Credits

Musicians
Vocals: Harry Connick Jr., Kim Burrell
Piano: Harry Connick Jr., Jonathan Batiste
Organ: Harry Connick Jr.
Keyboards: Kim Burrell, Jonathan Batiste, Harry Connick Jr.
Background Vocals: Jonathan Batiste, Bill Huntington, Evan Vidar, Jonathan DuBose Jr., The Honolulu Heartbreakers
Trombone: Craig Klein, John Allred, Lucien Barbarin, Troy Andrews, Mark Mullins
Bass Trombone: Joe Barati
Trumpet: Roger Ingram, Derrick Gardner, Joe Magnarelli, Leonard Brown, Mark Braud, Wynton Marsalis
Tuba: John Allred
Bass: Neal Caine
Guitar: Jonathan DuBose Jr., Evan Vidar
Alto saxophone: Charles Goold, James Greene
Baritone saxophone: David Schumacher
Tenor saxophone: Jerry Weldon, Mike Karn, Geoff Burke
Banjo: Bill Huntington
Flugelhorn: Joe Magnarelli, Roger Ingram
Drums: Arthur Latin II
Percussion: Arthur Latin II

Other
Arranger: Harry Connick Jr.
Conductor: Harry Connick Jr., John David Miller
Orchestration: Harry Connick Jr.
Soloist:  Charles Goold, Jerry Weldon, Lucien Barbarin, Mark Braud
Coordination: Maria S. Betro
Music Preparation: Geoff Burke
Copyist: Geoff Burke
Engineer: Vincent Caro
Mixing: Vincent Caro
Producer: Tracey Freeman
Assistant Engineer: Hyomin Kang, Rick Kwan
Art Direction: Arnold Levine
Design: Arnold Levine
Mastering: Vlado Meller
Digital Editing: Alex Venguer, Anthony Ruotolo, Bryant Pugh
Art Producer: Mary Ellen Stefanides
Executive Producer: Ann Marie Wilkins
Cover Photo: Palma Kolansky

References

External links
Audio samples at Harry Connick Jr.'s official Sony website.

2007 albums
Columbia Records albums
Harry Connick Jr. albums